Alghoza is a paired woodwind instrument. It is traditionally used by Baloch, Saraiki, Sindhi, Kutchi, Punjabi and Rajasthani folk musicians. It consists of two joined beak flutes, one for melody, the second for drone. The flutes are either tied together or may be held together loosely with the hands. A continuous flow of air is necessary as the player blows into the two flutes simultaneously. The quick recapturing of breath on each beat creates a bouncing, swinging rhythm. The wooden instrument initially comprised two flute pipes of the same length but over time, one of them was shortened for sound purposes. In the world of Alghoza playing, the two flute pipes are a couple — the longer one is the male and the shorter one the female instrument.  With the use of beeswax, the instrument can be scaled to any tune.

Origin 

It originated at around 7500 BC in Mesopotamia, it then reached Iran and eventually Pakistan with some modifications. Some Mesopotamian archaic paintings contain a musical instrument very similar to Alghoza.

In Mesopotamia, this instrument was called "Al-Joza", which literally means, "The twin". As it reached Pakistan, the "J" in "Al-Joza" became "gh" and eventually the modified form of this instrument which reached Pakistan came to be known as Alghoza.

References 

Books

 

Folk instruments of Punjab
Indian musical instruments
Pakistani musical instruments
Folk instruments of Sindh